Prashant Solanki (born 22 February 2000) is an Indian cricketer. He made his List A debut on 25 February 2021, for Mumbai in the 2020–21 Vijay Hazare Trophy, taking a five-wicket haul in the match. He made his Twenty20 debut on 9 November 2021, for Mumbai in the 2021–22 Syed Mushtaq Ali Trophy. In February 2022, he was bought by the Chennai Super Kings in the auction for the 2022 Indian Premier League tournament. He made his first-class debut on 24 February 2022, for Mumbai in the 2021–22 Ranji Trophy.

References

External links
 

2000 births
Living people
Indian cricketers
Mumbai cricketers
Chennai Super Kings cricketers
Place of birth missing (living people)